Laura Roca (born 8 January 1980) is a Spanish former freestyle swimmer who competed in the 2000 Summer Olympics and in the 2004 Summer Olympics.

References

1980 births
Living people
Spanish female freestyle swimmers
Olympic swimmers of Spain
Swimmers at the 2000 Summer Olympics
Swimmers at the 2004 Summer Olympics
European Aquatics Championships medalists in swimming
Mediterranean Games gold medalists for Spain
Mediterranean Games medalists in swimming
Swimmers at the 2001 Mediterranean Games